The following is a chronological list (by year of birth) of American composers of classical music.

Baroque 
John Tufts (1689–1750)
Charles Theodore Pachelbel  (1690–1750)
Thomas Walter (1696–1725)

Classical era

Romantic era

Modern/contemporary

References

Reference bibliography 

 
 

American